Mary Bond Davis (born June 3, 1958) is a singer, actor, and dancer from Los Angeles, California. She is best known for her performance as Motormouth Maybelle in the 2002 Broadway run of Hairpsray.

Biography
Davis began her career at the age of 15 singing with different bands. She was a member of The Young Americans from 1974 to 1976, and appeared with them on The Bing Crosby Christmas Show.

In 1980, Davis auditioned for Ain't Misbehavin', which traveled throughout the United States and Canada, and in 1982, spent a year with the world tour of Ain't Misbehavin.

Davis' most memorable film appearance is in Eddie Murphy's Coming To America. Additional film credits include Jo Jo Dancer, Your Life Is Calling; The Art Of Dying; Hook; Jeffrey; New York Minute; and Romance and Cigarettes.

Davis was in the original cast of the Broadway shows Mail, Jelly's Last Jam, Marie Christine, and Hairspray.

She is a three-time winner of the Drama-Logue Award (Get Happy, Shout Up A Morning, A...My Name Is Alice).

References

External links
 https://www.imdb.com/name/nm0205118/ Mary Bond Davis
 http://ibdb.com/person.php?id=76584 Mary Bond Davis
 https://web.archive.org/web/20081113102450/http://www.playbill.com/multimedia/detail/2315/629

1958 births
20th-century American actresses
21st-century American actresses
Living people
American film actresses
African-American actresses
American stage actresses
American television actresses
Actresses from California
The Young Americans members
20th-century African-American women
20th-century African-American people
21st-century African-American women
21st-century African-American people